Alers is a surname. Notable people with the surname include:

Frederick Alers Hankey (1832–1892), English banker and Conservative politician who sat in the House of Commons from 1885 to 1892
Karmine Alers, singer, former member of 3rd Party
Rafael Alers (1903–1978), musician, composer, bandleader and the first Puerto Rican to compose the music score for a Hollywood feature film
Rochelle Alers (born 1963), African-American writer of romance novels
Yassmin Alers, American stage actor